

Æthelfrith was a medieval Bishop of Elmham.

Æthelfrith was consecrated in 736 and died sometime after that year.

Notes

References

External links
 

Bishops of Elmham